"Nothin' You Can Do About It" is a rock song recorded by Richard Marx for his second album, Repeat Offender. It is the fourth single released from the album. "Nothin' You Can Do About It" hit number 12 on Billboard's Rock Chart, and in addition has the participation of Steve Lukather on guitar.

Personnel 
 Richard Marx – lead and backing vocals
 Michael Omartian – acoustic piano
 Bill Champlin – Hammond B3 organ, backing vocals
 Steve Lukather – rhythm guitar, guitar solo 
 John Pierce – bass
 Mike Baird – drums
 Bobby Kimball – backing vocals

1989 singles
Richard Marx songs
Songs written by Richard Marx
1989 songs
Capitol Records singles